Takasaki (written: 高崎 or 高嵜) is a Japanese surname. Notable people with the surname include:

, Japanese musician and songwriter
, Japanese politician
, Japanese footballer
, Japanese baseball player
, Japanese footballer
Ryusui Takasaki (born 1976), Japanese sumo wrestler and coach
, Japanese businessman and politician

Japanese-language surnames